Radiša Ilić (Serbian Cyrillic: Радиша Илић; born 20 September 1977) is a Serbian former professional footballer who played as a goalkeeper.

Club career
After starting out at Sloboda Užice, Ilić was transferred to Partizan in the summer of 1998. He spent the next five seasons at the club, winning three championship titles (1999, 2002, and 2003) and one national cup (2001).

Following a brief spell with Romanian club Național București, Ilić returned to his homeland and represented Borac Čačak (2004–2006) and OFK Beograd (2006–2008). He subsequently moved abroad for the second time and joined Greek side Panserraikos, failing to help them avoid relegation from the top flight in the 2008–09 season.

In June 2010, Ilić rejoined Partizan after seven years. He collected three more domestic trophies with the Crno-beli, before retiring from the game in the 2013 winter transfer window.

International career
Ilić recorded his only cap for Serbia in a 1–1 friendly draw against Macedonia on 6 February 2008, keeping a clean sheet in the first half before being substituted for Damir Kahriman.

Honours
Partizan
 Serbian SuperLiga: 1998–99, 2001–02, 2002–03, 2010–11, 2011–12
 Serbian Cup: 2000–01, 2010–11

References

External links
 Superleague Greece profile 
 
 

FC Progresul București players
Association football goalkeepers
Expatriate footballers in Greece
Expatriate footballers in Romania
First League of Serbia and Montenegro players
FK Borac Čačak players
FK Partizan non-playing staff
FK Partizan players
FK Sloboda Užice players
Liga I players
OFK Beograd players
Panserraikos F.C. players
People from Bajina Bašta
Serbia and Montenegro expatriate footballers
Serbian expatriate sportspeople in Romania
Serbia and Montenegro footballers
Serbia international footballers
Serbian expatriate footballers
Serbian expatriate sportspeople in Greece
Serbian footballers
Serbian SuperLiga players
Super League Greece players
1977 births
Living people